The International Biology Olympiad (IBO) is a biological olympiad for pre-university students under the age 20, and is one of the most well-known International Science Olympiads. The first IBO was held in Czechoslovakia in 1990, and it has since been held annually. The competition have gradually expanded to include more than 75 participating countries across five continents. All participating countries send the four winners of their National Biology Olympiad to the IBO, usually accompanied by two adults who are members of the international jury, for the duration of the competition. 

To select these top four life science contestants for this international competition, all member countries host Biology Olympiad competitions in typically 3-5 consecutively more difficult national competition rounds. As a consequence, this leads to a trickle-down effect, engaging more than 1 million students worldwide in life science each year. 

In 2020, during the COVID-19 pandemic, the IBO (host: Japan) was organized virtually and was rated "a great success" and "highly successful" in the history of IBO because of its exceptional way of operation and the unique international group-based scientific project International Group Project 2020.

In 2021, the COVID-19 pandemic forced the Portuguese IBO host to go virtual once again: the 2021 IBO was replaced by the IBO Challenge II, from July 18 to July 23.

IBO 2020 and the International Group Project 
In the face of the threat of the International Science Olympiads' cancellation due to the COVID-19 pandemic (the International Physics Olympiad was officially canceled), the IBO 2020 was the first in the International Science Olympiads that was claimed by the host (Japan) to be held entirely virtually with a guaranteed supervision to adapt to the pandemic. 

Notably, in the IBO 2020, the International Group Project was proposed. This is the first international group-based scientific project in the history of International Science Olympiads, aiming to intensify scientific discussion and collaboration among competitors from various countries.  

In the International Group Project 2020, there are 50 research teams, and every team consists of 4 to 7 competitors, all representing different countries. In each team, these young biologists collaborated with their international fellows in a three-month scientific project. Finally, they had to propose a professional poster or presentation about an outstanding, innovative idea that can determine biology's future and solve a critical global issue. Every performance was evaluated by noble professors of Japan in life science. 

Altogether, 53 countries and 202 contestants participated in the International Group Project 2020. This project was described as "the first trial of a collaborative research opportunity in IBO's history." Among 50 teams, six outstanding teams had (25 students) received the Award of Excellence for the best performance.

Summary 
Each year, the IBO is organised by a different country.

See also 
 Biology by Team
 Iranian Biology Olympiad
 USA Biology Olympiad
 Asian Physics Olympiad
 International Chemistry Olympiad
 International Astronomy Olympiad
 International Physics Olympiad
 List of biology awards

References

External links 
 
 Biolympiads www.biolympiads.com

International Science Olympiad
Biology awards
Science events
Recurring events established in 1990